The Bell Museum, formerly known as the James Ford Bell Museum of Natural History, is located at the University of Minnesota. The museum's new location on the St. Paul campus opened July 13–15, 2018. The Minnesota wildlife dioramas, numerous animal specimens from all over the world, and the 120-seat digital Whitney and Elizabeth MacMillan Planetarium theater are highlighted features of the new facility. The museum's former location in Minneapolis is closed as the work to move to the University of Minnesota's St. Paul campus began in January 2017. The museum is part of the university's College of Food, Agricultural and Natural Resource Sciences.

History 

The museum was established by state legislative mandate in 1872 to collect, preserve, skillfully prepare, display, and interpret Minnesota's diverse animal and plant life for scholarly research, teaching and for public appreciation, enrichment, and enjoyment. Its governance belongs, by state legislative designation, to the University of Minnesota.

The museum was first located in a single room in a building on the University of Minnesota's Minneapolis campus. The museum was reorganized by physician and ornithologist Thomas Sadler Roberts with the help of his friend James Ford Bell, the founder of General Mills and a passionate conservationist, who put up half the cost ($150,000) for a new building to house some new nature dioramas. Bell wanted the university to add a diorama of gray wolves in their natural environment, in order promote their conservation, since the state paid hunters a bounty for killing wolves in the 1930s. The remaining funds were raised through donations and federal government funding, and the James Ford Bell Museum of Natural History opened in 1940 at University Avenue and Church Street. The building was expanded in the 1960s and 1970s, but by the 1980s the building was suffering from leaks, cracks, mold and water damage, which threatened the collections and the dioramas.

After a decades-long planning and legislative process, led by State Representative Alice Hausman, the Minnesota Legislature struck an agreement where the university would borrow $51.5 million for the project and the state would pay the debt service on the bonds over a span of 25 years. James Ford Bell's grandson, Ford Bell, is a former president of the American Alliance of Museums and a trustee of the James Ford Bell Foundation, which donated $3 million for the new museum.  The university broke ground on the project on Earth Day, April 22, 2016.

New building details
The Bell Museum finished development of a new facility to house its public collections and a 120-seat digital planetarium, and serve as a public gateway to University of Minnesota research. Designed by Perkins and Will, the new museum finished construction on the St. Paul Campus of the University of Minnesota at 2088 Larpenteur Ave W, Falcon Heights, MN. New enhancements include an outdoor learning landscape, a dedicated parking lot, and new permanent and temporary exhibit galleries. The estimated project budget of the new facility and moving is $64.2 million. In 2014, the Minnesota Legislative session passed the bonding bill which included $51.5 million in funding for the new facility.

Collections
With more than 4 million specimens, the Bell's scientific collections have provided opportunities for research and teaching since the museum's inception in 1872. The museum recently launched the Minnesota Biodiversity Atlas, an online, searchable interface integrating over 5 terabytes of data from the Bell Museum on birds, mammals, fishes, plants, and fungi to enhance research capacity to perform a range of activities from biological surveys to conservation planning. (bellatlas.umn.edu) This database contains over 400,000 scientific records and as many as 175,000 high-resolution images with plans to expand entries and specimen photographs.

Amphibian and Reptile Collection 
The Amphibian and Reptile Collection is a diverse collection that has a heavy focus on the upper Midwest region and represents one of the best collections of herpetological material for this region.

Bird Collection 
The Bird Collection Collection specimens come from the upper midwest and the majority of these are from Minnesota. In addition to this research collection, the Bell Museum maintains a dedicated teaching collection that is actively used in courses at the university.

Fish Collection 
The Fish Collection contain specimens from the Menage expedition to the Philippines in the 1890s; fish from Hawaii collected in the early 1900s; and many other specimens from across the continental United States.

Fungi Collection 
The Fungi Collection comprise about 10% of Minnesota fungi, and the remainder are from North America and elsewhere.

Lichen Collection 
The Lichen Collection is one of the largest lichen herbaria in the US, and one of the few fully digitalized in the world. It houses collections of lichens worldwide.

Invertebrate Collection 
The Mollusks and Crustaceans Invertebrate Collection house freshwater mollusks collected in Minnesota, and represent an important Upper Midwest Collection. The invertebrate collection holds the old Minneapolis Library collection of Indo-Pacific mollusks.

Mammal Collection 
The majority of the Mammal Collection  are standard, dry skin and skull preparations, but the Bell has a reasonably large collection of full skeletons and a growing collection of fluid preserved specimens.

Vascular Plant Collection 
The Vascular Plant Collection contains samples of vegetative parts, cones, fruit, and seeds.

Exhibits

This description refers to exhibits in the museum's former location on 10 Church St.
Dioramas 
The Bell Museum's dioramas were located on two floors of the Minneapolis site, and displayed Minnesota's habitats, along with the birds, animals, plants and insects that populate them. There are moose, elk, bear, beavers, cranes, fish, and more. The dioramas serve as an opportunity to learn animal facts, observe animal behavior, and find out how species survive. Constructed between 1920 and the late 1940s, the Bell Museum's dioramas illustrate what Minnesota was like before the ax and plow.

Renowned artist Francis Lee Jaques completed backgrounds on nine of the large dioramas and ten of the medium-size dioramas. Jaques grew up in Minnesota where he pursued his passion for painting and illustrating nature.

Touch and See Room 
The Touch and See Room came into being in 1968. Public Education Coordinator Richard Barthelemy, known as Bart, realized that young and old visitors alike wanted to get their hands on all the specimens that are traditionally behind glass in museums.

Bart started by sitting down with groups and passing around bones and furs and feathers and such and talking with them about what was there. He teamed with Dr. Roger Johnson from the University of Minnesota's Department of Curriculum and Instruction in the College of Education to figure out how to make the experience work at its best. Shortly after Touch and See opened, the Smithsonian Institution's National Museum of Natural History in Washington D.C. visited the Bell and then launched its famous discovery room.

Now, the touch and see room is home not only to the original collections, but also to multiple live specimens, including snakes, frogs, geckos, cockroaches, and tarantulas.

Rainforest Gallery 
“Under the Fig Leaf” is a living rainforest and active research project managed by the museum's Curator of Plants, Professor George Weiblen. Many of the plants were grown from seeds collected by Weiblen in tropical forests around the world like Papua New Guinea. Visitors can get a ground floor and canopy view of the mini rainforest and learn about related University of Minnesota research.

ExploraDome 
The museum's former film screening room was retrofitted to house a halfdome planetarium theater. Museum staff lead audiences on a virtual voyage from the surface of the Earth to the edge of the known universe in an intimate environment, holding up to 15 people per show. All presentations are given live by a planetarium educator and allow for audience interaction, unless noted as "pre-recorded."

Geodome 
The museum's inflatable geodome is the traveling version of the ExploraDome that is brought to the school and locations across the state and region. It was the first geodome theater in Minnesota. Primarily used for educational outreach visits, the geodome also makes an annual trip the Minnesota State Fair for STEM Day.

Traveling Exhibits 
The Bell Museum of Natural History develops and circulates exhibitions on a broad range of topics. With these exhibitions, the Bell seeks to instill a greater appreciation of our natural world and promote a better understanding of contemporary ecological issues. Although many of the exhibitions are designed for small-to medium-sized spaces, the Bell's exhibits have traveled to museums of all sizes throughout the United States and Canada. Most of the exhibits require gallery installation, but several are self-supporting, lightweight, and easily assembled. These are ideal for bookings in either museum or non-museum settings, such as visitor centers, schools, and libraries.

Whitney and Elizabeth MacMillan Planetarium
The Minnesota Planetarium Society (MNPS) was a Minnesota-based organization for the promotion of an education in astronomy which operated the Minnesota Planetarium from 1960 until it was closed in 2002. When the Minneapolis Central Library was torn down in 2002, the former planetarium was closed with the understanding that it would be rebuilt as part of the new library. In September 2011, the Planetarium Society merged with the University of Minnesota's Bell Museum of Natural History instead. The new building features a digital planetarium that uses INSIGHT Dual Laser 4K projection system.

The planetarium is named after Whitney MacMillan and his wife.

Programs 
The museum has a variety of programming and events that caters to a range of age groups. Science labs, summer camps, Spotlight Science, Sensory Friendly Saturdays, After Hours, and Star Parties  are several of the offerings that spark an interest and appreciation for science, technology, art, engineering and math.

Admission

References

External links 

 Bell Museum Homepage
 College of Food, Agricultural and Natural Resource Sciences Homepage
 Bell Museum of Natural History records, University Archives, University of Minnesota - Twin Cities

Museums in Minneapolis
Natural history museums in Minnesota
University museums in Minnesota
University of Minnesota
Planetaria in the United States
Museums established in 1872
1872 establishments in Minnesota